The 7th Vermont Infantry Regiment was a three years' infantry regiment in the Union Army during the American Civil War. It served in the Western Theater, predominantly in Louisiana and Florida, from February 1862 to March 1866. It was the longest serving Vermont regiment during the war.

Seventh Vermont Regiment was mustered into Federal service on February 12, 1862, at Rutland, Vermont. It was engaged in, or present at, the 1862 first Siege of Vicksburg, Battle of Baton Rouge, Battle of Gonzales Station, the Mobile Campaign and Spanish Fort, and Whistler, Alabama.

Western theater
The Regiment proceeded from Rutland on March 10, 1862, to New York City, boarding the sailing ships Premier and Tammerlane, and sailed to Ship Island (Mississippi). The Premier arrived April 5 and Tammerlane on the 10th. On May 3, Companies B, C, and part of D boarded the gunboats USS New London and USS Calhoun and were sent to capture Fort Pike, which guarded the entrance to Lake Pontchartrain. They found the Confederates had just evacuated the fort. They occupied it without opposition and set about repairing the damage inflicted by the Confederates as they left. The rest of the regiment was shipped to Carrollton, New Orleans, on the Steamer Whitman.

On May 15, 1862, the Regiment, minus those at Fort Pike, sailed on the Iberville to Baton Rouge.

On June 19, 1862, eight companies boarded the steamers Ceres and Morning Light for the ill-conceived and under-manned expedition to lay siege to Vicksburg, Mississippi, arriving near Vicksburg on the 25th. The Siege of Vicksburg was abandoned on July 24, and the Regiment returned to Baton Rouge on July 26, with 100 of the 800 men who went up the river still fit for duty.

The Battle of Baton Rouge took place on August 5, 1862, a very foggy day. Many units fired on other Union troops, with the 7th firing, on orders of Brigadier General Thomas Williams, into the neighboring 21st Indiana Regiment. During the battle,  Williams was killed and the 7th's Commander, Colonel George T. Roberts, was mortally wounded, dying two days later. The Confederate attack was defeated.

Before the battle, no preparations, such as digging entrenchments, nor any defensive plans were made, despite the knowledge that CS General Breckinridge had a large force nearby. After the battle, General Benjamin Butler directed blame for Union confusion and poor performance on the 7th, including firing on other Union troops and withdrawing from the front lines during the battle. The "withdrawal" was the evacuation of the hospital, including a large number of 7th Vermont troops, to the river bank to keep them safe. The allegations of Butler poisoned his relations with the Regiment, whose Officers were aware of Butler's continued Presidential ambitions. It was their opinion that Butler, though he wasn't at the battle, might be blamed for the poor performance of the troops in the battle and decided to scapegoat the Vermont Regiment because it represented the least politically powerful State that had troops in the battle. Butler forbade the Regiment permission to put the battle honor "Baton Rouge" on their battle flag and prohibited their carrying the colors. Permission to carry was later restored.

On August 20, 1862, Baton Rouge was evacuated, and the 7th returned to Carrollton.

Florida campaign
Butler became aware that the commander of the forts south of Pensacola, Florida, was not happy with the conduct and performance of one of his regiments, so 7th Vermont was sent there in exchange for the 6th New York Volunteer Infantry (Wilson's Zouaves). The Regiment boarded the steam tugboat Nassau on November 13, 1862, arriving in Escambia Bay the next day.

The Regiment performed garrison duties at Fort Barrancas and Fort Pickens from November 1862 until August 1864. In early February a detail of Company B established an outpost at Point Washington, Florida on Choctawhatchee Bay to receive refugees and runaway slaves. They would be sent to the forts where white males would be enlisted in the 1st Florida Cavalry Regiment (Union) and male slaves into the 82nd or 86 U.S. Colored Infantry. On February 8, a detachment proceeded to Haine's Bluff where they captured Company E, 4th Florida Infantry Battalion without firing a shot. Before they could return to Point Washington, they were run down by Company A, and a detachment of Company E, 5th Florida Cavalry Battalion that freed the prisoners and captured half of the Union troops involved in the raid. After this the outpost at Point Washington was abandoned.

On February 13, 1864, 110 new recruits arrived from Vermont. During February, soldiers of the 7th reenlisted for three years or the duration of the War and had their designation changed to 7th Regiment Vermont Veteran Volunteers. On July 20, 1864, a Union force, including four companies of the 7th, were dispatched from Fort Barrancas on a raid up to Pollard, Alabama. Along the way, they were attacked by CS troops and a skirmish ensued at the Gonzalez Farm.

Mobile campaign
On August 10, 1864, the 7th (without the new recruits) boarded the steamer Hudson to travel back to Vermont for a reenlistment furlough, arriving in Brattleboro August 26. The Regiment reassembling there on 27 September 1864. They departed on the 30th and arrived in New York City on October 1, boarding the steamer "Cassandra" on October 3 for New Orleans, and arriving there on the 13th.

Seventh Vermont was part of Gen. Gordon Granger's 13th Corps. for the Mobile Campaign, participating in the Siege of Spanish Fort, a battle at Whistler, Alabama, and the surrender of the CS Army of Mobile at Citronelle, Alabama. During the Siege of Spanish fort the 7th was assigned to the siege of Fort McDermett. During that siege the Captain and 20 men of Company K were captured and sent to a POW camp.

Texas assignment
On May 30, 1865, the Regiment boarded the steamer "Starlight" for Mobile, where the men were transferred to the steamer "General Sedgwick" and shipped to Texas. They arrived June 5 to become part of the "Army of Observation" along the Rio Grande, keeping an eye on Maximilian's French Army there. They were officially mustered out on March 14, 1866, traveling as a group back to Brattleboro, where the unit disbanded on April 6, 1866.

Summary
Seventh Vermont lost during its term of service 11 men killed and mortally wounded, 15 dead from accident, 6 dead in Confederate prisons, and 379 dead of disease, for a campaign loss of 411 men, plus another 242 discharged for disability, primarily from disease, reaching a total of 649.

References

External links
 Vermont National Guard Library and Museum

Units and formations of the Union Army from Vermont
1862 establishments in Vermont